Fight for Life may refer to:

 The Fight for Life, a 1940 American movie directed by Pare Lorentz.
 Fight for Life (film), a 1987 American TV movie.
 Fight for Life (TV series), a 2007 UK health series.
 Fight for Life (video game), a 1996 game for the Atari Jaguar.
 Fight for Life (New Zealand charity), a cancer charity whose boxing events are promoted by Dean Lonergan.
 Fight for Life (UK charity), a children's cancer charity whose onetime patron was Gary Lineker.